54 is a 1998 American drama film written and directed by Mark Christopher. Its plot focuses on the rise and fall of Studio 54, a famous nightclub in New York City during the late 1970s and early 1980s. The film stars Ryan Phillippe, Salma Hayek, Neve Campbell, and Mike Myers as Steve Rubell, the club's co-founder. 

54 was released in the United States on August 28, 1998, by Miramax. Prior to its release, the film was extensively reshot and recut, and then released to poor critical reaction but a somewhat respectable box office. In 2008, a bootleg version of the director's cut was screened at Outfest, leading to interest for its release. In 2015, Christopher and Miramax premiered a new edit of the film at the Berlin International Film Festival, with 45 minutes of original material restored and 30 minutes of studio re-shoots removed.

Plot

Theatrical version
In the summer of 1979, 19-year-old Irish-American filling station attendant Shane O'Shea lives in Jersey City, New Jersey with his widowed, conservative father Harlan and two younger sisters Grace and Kelly. Shane longs for a more glamorous life across the river in New York's Manhattan, so one night he talks his two friends into going to Studio 54, a disco nightclub. Once inside, Shane is exposed to the flashy, hedonistic world of 54, with unbridled alcohol, drugs, and open sex. Against his father’s wishes, Shane returns to 54 the next night and is hired by Steve as a busboy. Shane eventually moves out of his family's house in Jersey City after fighting with his father over his new job, and moves in with Greg and Anita in Manhattan.

After a short time bussing tables, Shane gets promoted to bartender with the help of a club regular Billie Auster, a customer who has a one-night stand with Shane. Shane's promotion causes tension with Greg as Greg feels that he didn't get the job because he wouldn't let Steve perform oral sex on him. Shane gains status and does an interview article/beefcake photo shoot for Interview Magazine, uses drugs, and sleeps with multiple women as he makes a name for himself. After a while, Shane begins to feel as if people only want him for sex.

Shane’s fame also affects his relationships with his friends and family. Greg, who now deals drugs on the side for extra money, criticizes Shane for his conceited attitude on Christmas Eve and accuses him of trying to sleep with Anita after catching him making a pass at her once before at their apartment. Shane’s father Harlan, whom he hasn’t seen or spoken to since he moved to New York City, rejects him when he comes home to visit on Christmas Day after a female family friend who got into 54 one night informs Harlan that she saw Shane doing drugs there. However, Shane does experience some brief happiness during the holidays when he strikes up a short-lived romance with his celebrity crush (and fellow New Jerseyan) Julie Black, a soap opera starlet determined to succeed in the film industry.

Shane discovers Julie with Roland Sachs, an agent that she plans to sleep with, causing Shane to reject her. In his anger, Shane gets into a fight with Steve. Steve fires Shane and has him thrown out of the club. Simultaneously, the FBI raids 54 and arrests Steve, as he’s been skimming money from the club’s nightly take. As Shane leaves 54 in disgrace, Julie passes by him, and they part ways but agree to remain friends.

An epilogue reveals the fates of the main characters. Julie moves to Hollywood and gets a small part in a movie. Anita records a moderately successful album with Casablanca Records and Greg gets a job in construction after six months' probation for dealing drugs at 54. Shane works nights as a restaurant manager in Greenwich Village and takes business classes at NYU during the day. Steve is convicted and sentenced to 18 months in jail, causing 54 to close as a result; upon release, he is forced to sell 54 but remains as a consultant under the new management. Greg and Anita reunite at the newly reopened 54, where Steve is hosting a one-night welcome-back party for all of his old friends and employees after his release from prison. Ultimately, 54 closes permanently in 1986, and Steve dies of AIDS in 1989 at age 45.

Director's cut additions
The director's cut opens with a new narration of the movie's original opening as Shane is seen leaving 54 after being thrown out on New Year’s Eve. Shane’s narration from the theatrical version is eliminated.

Shane is openly bisexual. In a moment of confusion, he kisses Greg in the VIP room on Christmas Eve. Shane then has sex with Anita in the ladies’ room after she and Greg have a fight. Anita sees Steve watching them. She hits Shane in the stomach and runs out of the ladies' room in shame.

When Shane runs low on cash due to his numerous debts, Greg lets him in on his drug-dealing operation. Shane steals some of Steve's skimmed cash as capital and repays it on New Year's Eve.

Greg eventually agrees to let Steve perform oral sex on him for the bartender job, but Steve says he'd rather watch Greg and Anita have sex instead, as he did on Christmas Eve. Greg goes to the cloakroom to confront Anita and sees her hugging Shane. Greg gets into a fistfight with Shane. Shane freebases cocaine to ease his emotional pain.

After Greg and Anita reconcile following her interrupted debut performance, Anita leaves with Billie for a photo op. Shane discovers G-men raiding Steve’s office and runs back upstairs to warn Greg, but Greg ignores him. Greg then runs to get his things from his locker when he sees Shane being thrown out of the club, but discovers that a G-man has already beat him to it and has found his drugs.

After Shane is thrown out of 54, he sees Greg running up behind him. Shane offers him his garbage bag cloak, and Greg begrudgingly accepts. Anita runs to them in a fancy fur coat and cloaks Greg in it with her as they both depart. Greg calls for Shane to come along with them, just as Julie pulls up alongside in her limousine and offers Shane a ride. Shane declines and leaves with Greg and Anita, the three of them staying together as a family instead of drifting apart.

Cast

Production
Based on two short films Mark Christopher made, Miramax Films persuaded Christopher to direct the full-length feature about Studio 54. He had spent five years researching the club and the time period while working on a screenplay. Miramax purchased a partial screenplay in 1995 and developed the script with the filmmaker for over a year.

Christopher shot the film in Toronto over two months in the fall of 1997. However, studio head Harvey Weinstein and Christopher differed on their respective visions of the film. Christopher intended for the film to capture Studio 54’s notoriety as “the epicenter of the gay cultural explosion in New York City,” and wanted the story to be told from the perspective of “Shane, a kid from New Jersey who sleeps his way to the top of the 54 pecking order, which means that he becomes one of the shirtless bartenders for which the club was notorious, golden boys who flexed and preened for the clientele of both sexes, occasionally deigning to grant sexual favors in return for money and drugs”. Conversely, Weinstein wanted a more commercial film in the vein of Saturday Night Fever, with its gay storyline removed.

Weinstein screen tested Christopher’s cut of the film on Long Island in early 1998. Audiences at this screening reacted negatively to the lead character's bisexuality, particularly to a scene where Shane and Greg kiss as well as the happy ending for both characters and Anita. Miramax subsequently requested the film remove any suggestions of bisexuality. The post-production process was a troubled one, with Weinstein hiring a second writing team to flesh out new scenes that play up a romance between Shane and Julie. Christopher was not allowed in the editing room, and though he agreed to shoot the new scenes after initial resistance, he did not get to see the final cut.

Reception and legacy
54 opened at #4 in its opening weekend (August 28–30, 1998) with $6,611,532 behind Blade, There's Something About Mary, and Saving Private Ryan.

Studio cut 
The studio cut of the film received almost universally poor reviews but was a modest commercial success, grossing $16 million on an estimated budget of $13 million. Mike Myers, in his first serious dramatic role, garnered some of the film's only positive word-of-mouth. The role was Myers’ only foray into drama until 2009's Inglourious Basterds and 2018's Bohemian Rhapsody.

Though some critics noted Christopher manages to “[re-create] the club’s playfully subversive physical details: the glitter confetti and giant silver man-in-the-moon cokehead mobile, the VIP room hidden in the dank basement”, many were particularly disappointed with the film's fictional characters and storyline, believing that Studio 54's notorious, real-life past should have been explored with better detail and more realism.

On review aggregator website Rotten Tomatoes, the film holds an approval rating of 15%, based on 67 reviews, and an average rating of 4.10/10. The website's critical consensus reads, "Robbed of its integral LGBTQ themes, 54 is a compromised and disjointed glance at the glory days of disco". Audiences polled by CinemaScore gave the film an average grade of "C" on an A+ to F scale.

The 1998 film was nominated for two Razzie Awards, including Worst Actor for Ryan Phillippe and Worst Supporting Actress for Ellen Albertini Dow. Neve Campbell was nominated for Worst Supporting Actress (also for Wild Things) at the 1998 Stinkers Bad Movie Awards.

Director’s cut 
In the years after the theatrical cut's release, a bootleg VHS version of the two-hour-long rough cut began circulating. Strong word of mouth and support led to New York LGBTQ film festival Outfest screening the rough cut to a sold-out crowd in 2008. Christopher and his co-producer Jonathan King had been lobbying Miramax for years to allow them to remaster the director's cut for DVD. In 2014, the filmmakers received the greenlight to make 54: The Director's Cut from Zanne Devine, Miramax's then-VP of production. They completed the film in time for a screening in the Panorama section at the 65th Berlin International Film Festival in February 2015. The 105 minute-long cut included 44 minutes of restored footage, with all but a few seconds of the studio-dictated re-shot footage jettisoned.

The director's cut has received a much more positive critical response, and the film has a huge cult following among the LGBT community. Of 54: The Director's Cut, critic Louis Jordan wrote, "Driven by character and atmosphere rather than soapy plot, Christopher’s film is permeated by a melancholy that adds depth to the ecstatic party scenes. Mike Myers nails the pathos and charm behind Rubell’s luded-out lechery, while Phillippe’s measured performance, finally given space to breathe, is vulnerable, amoral, and sexy. There are no easy heroes or villains in this 54, only people looking for something they’ll likely never find."

Home media
A 2012 Blu-ray release features several additional and alternate scenes that were not included in the theatrical release. This extended cut runs 100 minutes, eight minutes of which are not in the studio's 92-minute release. Miramax and Lionsgate Home Entertainment released 54: The Director's Cut in digital HD on streaming video providers on June 2, 2015. A Blu-ray version of this cut was released in 2016.

References

Bibliography

External links

Official trailer

1998 drama films
1998 LGBT-related films
1998 films
American drama films
American independent films
American LGBT-related films
Casual sex in films
1990s English-language films
Films about bartenders
Films scored by Marco Beltrami
Films set in New Jersey
Films set in New York City
Films set in the 1970s
Films set in the 1980s
Male bisexuality in film
Miramax films
Studio 54
1998 directorial debut films
1998 independent films
Disco films
Films about drugs
Films set in 1979
1990s American films